Peripatopsis sedgwicki is a species of velvet worm in the Peripatopsidae family. Also known as the Tsitsikamma velvet worm, this species varies from blue-tan green to bright orange and brown violet. The number of legs in this species ranges from 19 pairs to 23 pairs, with a claw present on the genital pair and the last pair reduced more in the male than in the female. Females of this species range in size from 12 mm to 68 mm in length, whereas males range from 10 mm to 46 mm in length. Like other velvet worms in this genus, this species exhibits matrotrophic viviparity, that is, mothers in this genus retain eggs in their uteri and supply nourishment to their embryos, but without any placenta. The type locality is in South Africa. This species has a limited geographic distribution but is especially abundant in the indigenous forest of the Tsitsikamma mountains.

References

Endemic fauna of South Africa
Onychophorans of temperate Africa
Onychophoran species
Animals described in 1899